Paramillo Airport  is an airport serving San Cristóbal, the capital of the Táchira state of Venezuela.

The Paramillo non-directional beacon (Ident: PRM) is located on the field.

See also
Transport in Venezuela
List of airports in Venezuela

References

External links
 OpenStreetMap - Paramillo
 OurAirports - Paramillo
 SkyVector - Paramillo

Airports in Venezuela